Coleophora parthenogenella is a moth of the family Coleophoridae. It is found in Denmark and Sweden.

References

parthenogenella
Moths of Europe
Moths described in 2010